Safdarjung area consists of mainly two localities in South Delhi, namely Safdarjung Enclave and Safdarjung Development Area (SDA). There are several districts (called colonies) in Delhi located south to the tomb of Safdarjung, the second Nawab of Awadh, and an important administrator in the Mughal Imperial courts in Delhi, under Muhammad Shah in the 18th century.

Safdarjung Enclave

Safdarjung Enclave, developed by the Delhi Lease and Finance later DLF Limited after acquiring the farm lands from Humayunpur Village in the early 1960s under then Prime Minister Pandit Jawahar Lal Nehru is located just south of the Ring Road and north of the Hauz Khas Deer Park. South of Hauz Khas village is Safdarjung Development Area (SDA), built in the 1960s as an extension towards south. Both colonies are primarily residential.

Safdarjung Enclave built after Partition did not include land grants for refugees from what is now Pakistan.

The airstrip next to Safdarjung's Tomb that occupies the area between it and Safdarjung Enclave, formerly Delhi's main airport, is now known as Safdarjung Airport and is the home of the Delhi Flying Club. Many official flights for the Central and State government also leave and arrive here rather than at Delhi's main airport Indira Gandhi International Airport (formerly Palam Airport).

Major Schools in Safdarjung Enclave
 St. Mary's School
 Green Fields School
 Hill Grove Public School (Now known as Ambience Public School)
 Delhi Police Public School
 Sarvodaya Govt. Senior Secondary School

--Hospitals in Safdarjung Enclave--
 Sukhmani Hospital
 Centre For Sight
Aashlok Fortis Hospital
Diyos Hospital
Bhagat Medicare Centre And Nursing Home
Sanjeevani Plus Hospital

Major Schools in SDA
 St. Paul’s School
 Sahoday Senior Secondary School

Healthcare Centers in SDA
Safdarjung Hospital
Max Multi Speciality Center
Delhi Pain Management Center
Sports Injury Center
CB Physiotherapy Clinic

See also 

 Safdarjung railway station
 National Disaster Management Authority (India)
 Delhi

References

External links

 Neighbourhoods in Delhi
South Delhi district